Great Eastern Life Assurance Co. Ltd, often known as Great Eastern Life or Great Eastern, is a Singaporean multinational finance and insurance corporation with operations in various countries and jurisdictions in the Asia-Pacific region. Headquartered at Pickering Street in Raffles Place, it is a subsidiary of OCBC Bank, and it is the largest and oldest life insurance company in Singapore.

At 2006, the company had assets in excess of S$8 billion, 2.6 million policies in force served by 24 branch offices and a service network of more than 17,000 agents nationwide. In August 2007, it had S$45 billion in assets and 3 million policyholders. 

In 2020, the company's website stated that it has over S$90 billion in assets and over 8 million policyholders, including 5 million from government schemes. It has three distribution channels – a tied agency force, bancassurance, and financial advisory firm, Great Eastern Financial Advisers. It is the only life insurance company to be listed on the Singapore Exchange, and the largest insurance company in Southeast Asia in terms of assets and market capitalisation.

History

1908–1920: Early years
Incorporated on 26 August 1908 in Singapore, Great Eastern has claimed to be the oldest and most established life insurance company in Singapore.

1920–2004: International expansion
In 1920, Great Eastern Life Assurance (Malaysia) Berhad started as a subsidiary branch office of Great Eastern Life Assurance Co Ltd. in Singapore.

In November 1999, Great Eastern Life underwent restructuring to become a wholly owned life insurance arm of a financial holding company – Great Eastern Holdings Ltd. This was followed by a merger between Great Eastern Holdings and Overseas Assurance Corporation in December 2000.

In June 2004, Great Eastern Holdings became a substantially owned subsidiary of OCBC Bank, Singapore’s longest established local bank. OCBC Bank has assets of S$164 billion and a network of 390 branches and representative offices in 15 countries and territories including Singapore, Malaysia, Indonesia, Thailand, Vietnam, China, Hong Kong SAR, Taiwan, Brunei, Myanmar, Japan, Korea, Australia, United Kingdom and the United States. 

This network includes more than 280 branches and offices in Indonesia operated by OCBC Bank's subsidiary, Bank OCBC NISP. OCBC Bank and its banking subsidiaries offer a wide range of specialist financial services, from consumer, corporate, investment, private and transaction banking to treasury and stockbroking services.

In addition to Singapore where Great Eastern is headquartered, and Malaysia with 29 branches, Great Eastern also has a branch office in Brunei since 1975, a subsidiary company in Indonesia since 1996, and representative offices in Hanoi and Ho Chi Minh City.

Modern era
In June 2006, Great Eastern and Chongqing Land Properties Group launched their 50:50 joint venture life insurance company, Great Eastern Life Assurance (China) Co Ltd. This new company is headquartered in Chongqing which will act as a bridgehead for its expansion plans into the rest of China.

The company was also named Life Insurance Company of the Year at the Asia Insurance Industry Awards in 2011 and 2013, by Asia Insurance Review.

Other awards include:

HR Vendor of the Year in 2015 (Silver winner) by the Human Resource Magazine, for Best Insurance Vendor and Best Retirement and Pension Plans
Best Team of the Year Award in 2018, 2019 by the Singapore Business Review Management Excellence Awards 
Best Employer in Singapore in 2019 by Kincentric's Best Employers global certification programme
Most Transparent Company (Finance Category) in 2019 by Securities Investors Association Singapore (SIAS) Investors' Choice Awards
First within the Life Insurance sector in 2019 by Singapore Management University's (SMU) Customer Satisfaction Index of Singapore (CSISG)
Gold at the 2020 Hermes Creative Awards, organised by the Association of Marketing and Communication Professionals (USA)
5th in the Brand Finance Top 100 Singaporean Brands for 2020
Most Valuable Brand in Singapore 2020, by Brand Finance

References

External links 

Companies listed on the Singapore Exchange
Insurance companies of Singapore
Financial services companies established in 1908
Life insurance companies
Privately held companies of Singapore
Singaporean brands